The 2001 South African Figure Skating Championships were held in Pretoria on 14–16 August 2000. Skaters competed in the disciplines of men's and ladies' singles at the senior, novice, and pre-novice levels. There was also a junior and juvenile ladies' competition.

Senior results

Men

Ladies

External links
 Results

South African Figure Skating Championships, 2001
South African Figure Skating Championships